Captain Michael Cresap (April 17, 1742 – October 18, 1775) was a noted frontiersman born in Maryland, in what is now the United States.

Biography
Cresap was the son of the pioneer Colonel Thomas Cresap (17021790). He spent part of his adult years in the Ohio Country as a trader and land developer. He led several raids against Native Americans who were hostile to white settlement. In April, 1774 rumors spread that members of the Cherokee tribe had murdered several settlers along the frontier. Cresap, believing the rumors,  was apparently involved in a reprisal raid, and he or some of his followers killed two or three Indians in the vicinity of Captina Creek, in present day Ohio. None of the Indians killed were in fact Cherokee. The war leader Logan ( 1723?1780), of the Mingo Native Americans, accused Cresap of murdering his family. Logan's wife and pregnant sister were among those murdered. In fact, the killings were almost certainly perpetrated by Daniel Greathouse, yet Cresap was immortalized in Logan's speech — quoted in Thomas Jefferson's Notes on the State of Virginia (1785)  as the murderer of Logan's family.

As a result of the murders, Logan waged war on the settlements along the Ohio and in western Pennsylvania, killing, perhaps, nearly thirty men, women and children. Lord John Murray Dunmore, the Governor of Virginia, raised an army and appointed Cresap to the rank of Captain. The decisive battle of Lord Dunmore's War was the Battle of Point Pleasant (10 October 1774) in Virginia (now West Virginia). Here Dunmore's forces defeated a band of Shawnee Native Americans led by Cornstalk.

After Lord Dunmore's War, Cresap returned to Maryland and subsequently raised a company of riflemen for the Continental Army during the American Revolution. He died from illness in New York City while in the service of the army; he is interred there in Trinity Church Cemetery.

Legacy
The Michael Cresap House (1764)  Cresap's stone and brick house in western Maryland — was listed on the National Register of Historic Places in 1972.
The Cresap Rifle Club, a non-profit shooting range in Frederick, Maryland, has been open for almost a century and bears the surname of Michael Cresap.

See also
Captina Creek

References

External links
 The American Revolution Institute

1742 births
1775 deaths
People of colonial Maryland
Continental Army officers from Maryland
Burials at Trinity Church Cemetery
American people of English descent